Sean Grandillo (born December 9, 1992) is an American actor, singer and musician, known for his roles as the Voice of Otto in the 2015 Broadway revival of Spring Awakening, Eli Hudson in MTV's horror series Scream, Brett Young in ABC's comedy series The Real O'Neals, and Curly McLain in the 2021-2022 national tour of Oklahoma!.

Early life
Grandillo was born in Cleveland, Ohio and raised in Aurora, Ohio. He was educated at Leighton Elementary School and graduated from Aurora High School. He went on to attend Ithaca College for musical theatre, before dropping out to join the cast of Spring Awakening in Los Angeles.

Career

Acting
In 2014, Grandillo auditioned for Deaf West Theatre's production of Spring Awakening while on a break from college, and moved to Los Angeles two weeks later to star in the musical. He stayed with the company as the show transferred to Broadway, playing the double bass in the band and providing the Voice of Otto, while deaf actor Miles Barbee portrays the role of Otto Lämmermeier in sign language. In 2015, he guest appeared as Cooper in two episodes of ABC's crime drama series Secrets and Lies.

In January 2016, Grandillo guest-starred in a Mariska Hargitay-directed episode of NBC's legal drama series Law & Order: Special Victims Unit as Chris Roberts, a high school senior accused of sexually assaulting a freshman. He then appeared in Justin Kelly's gay porn drama film King Cobra, alongside James Franco. In March 2016, he was cast in the recurring role of Eli Hudson in the second season of MTV's horror series Scream. In the same year, Grandillo appeared as Miles Brekov in the Netflix mystery series, The OA. He recurred as Kenny's boyfriend, Brett Young, in the ABC comedy series The Real O'Neals. In 2018, Grandillo starred in the role of Colin Cowher on the comedy-drama series Youth & Consequences.

Grandillo began playing the role of Curly in the national tour of Oklahoma! on November 6, 2021.

Music
Grandillo's music career began with what started as a My Chemical Romance cover band called Rumored Alone.

On October 15, 2015, Grandillo released his first single, "New." In August 2016, he released his second single, "Why Is It so Hard to Change." On September 2, 2016, Grandillo released his first EP, also titled Why Is It so Hard to Change.

On August 25, 2017, Grandillo released his debut album titled Necessarily Trouble on iTunes and Spotify.

Discography

Extended plays

Singles

Filmography

Film

Television

Stage

References

External links 
 
 

1992 births
Living people
21st-century American male actors
American male film actors
American male musical theatre actors
American male singers
American male stage actors
American male television actors
American rock double-bassists
Male double-bassists
Male actors from Cleveland
Musicians from Cleveland
Singers from Ohio
21st-century double-bassists
21st-century American male musicians